Serbian studies or Serbistics is an academic discipline within Slavic studies which is focused on the study of Serbian language, literature, history and culture. Within Slavic studies it belongs to the South Slavic subgroup.

Main centers
Main centers of Serbian studies are situated in Serbia, mainly in Belgrade, and also in Novi Sad. A specialized faculty in Belgrade, called the Research Center for Serbian Studies was created in 2010 within the Department of History (Faculty of Philosophy, University of Belgrade. Various programs in Serbian studies are also taught at universities in Bosnia and Herzegovina, Montenegro, Croatia and some other European and North American countries. The North American Society for Serbian Studies (NASSS) is active since 1978. Its journal, called the Serbian Studies has reached the 28th volume. Special programs in Serbian studies are organized at the Columbia University.

See also
 Serbian Academy of Sciences and Arts
 Cultural Heritage of Serbia
 Matica srpska
 Slavic studies
 Yugoslav studies

References

Sources

External links
 Columbia University (2010): Serbian Studies

 
Serbian language
Serbian culture